The township of Yarram (formerly Yarram Yarram) is in Victoria, Australia, in the Shire of Wellington, located in the southeast of Gippsland. The town is the regional centre of a prosperous farming district. It has a vibrant community, which remains dedicated to a strong sporting culture. The town also has a strong tourism industry, with Tarra Bulga National Park, Port Albert, Ninety Mile Beach and Agnes Falls all being within a 30-minute commute from Yarram. The town is located about one and a half hours from Wilsons Promontory. Nearby towns include Welshpool, Alberton and Foster.

Etymology
The term 'Yarram Yarram' is thought to be an Aboriginal phrase meaning 'plenty of water,' however it is not known which language group the name is taken from.

History
The traditional custodians of the land surrounding Yarram are the Brataualung people of the Kurnai People, an Australian Aboriginal group, who resisted the invasion of their lands, and sustained heavy casualties as a result.

Being close to one of the first Victorian trade ports, the town grew quickly after settlement, as a result of the rich dairy country that supplies milk products to Australia, and to the timber industry. In 1841 the site, originally a low-lying swamp, was chosen by a Scottish clan leader, Aeneas Ronaldson MacDonnell, who, with his fellow Scots, attempted to set up a feudal-style court. However, the experiment folded and he subsequently moved to New Zealand.

The post office opened on 1 February 1861 as Yarram Yarram and was renamed Yarram in about 1925. The railway arrived in 1921; the line between Welshpool and Leongatha was closed in October 1987.

The Yarram Magistrates' Court closed on 1 January 1990.

Mr and Mrs A.J Thompson, publican and property developers local to Yarram, built the Regent Theatre and its two shops. The project was the last 'picture palace' of its time to be built in Gippsland and cost a total of 20,000 pounds. Today this amount would be around 36,444 Australian dollars.

Notable people from the Yarram area include famous 19th century Opera singer Ada Crossely who was born in Tarraville, Gippsland and received piano lessons with Mrs Hastings of the nearby Port Albert at the age of seven, and Kara Healey who was the first female park ranger in Victoria and an outstanding naturalist. She discovered two types of fungi (Poria Healeyi and Lambertella Healeyi) both of which were named after her.

Today
Yarram is known for its proximity to Ninety Mile Beach, Port Albert, neighbouring Tarra-Bulga National Park and heritage architecture in its Main Street, including the historic Regent Theatre.

The town has an Australian Rules football team by the name of the Yarram Demons (established in 1887) who are competing in the North Gippsland Football League. Yarram is the home of several former AFL footballers, including Royce Vardy, Anthony Banik (Richmond Tigers), Andrew Dunkley (Sydney Swans) and Jed Lamb (Carlton Blues). Current AFL players from the town include Josh Dunkley (Western Bulldogs), Nathan Vardy (West Coast Eagles) and Kyle Dunkley (Melbourne Demons).

Golfers play at the course of the Yarram Golf Club on Old Sale Road.

Yarram hosts an annual eisteddfod every August showcasing the area's artistic talents in music, speech and drama.

The town has a secondary college (Yarram Secondary College), a public primary school (Yarram Primary School) and a catholic primary school (St Mary's Primary School).

Graffiti artist Heesco has utilized Yarram's walls as his newest canvas and street art project. He, as well as his team of locals and associates (Friends of Heesco Town) have painted a multitude of Yarram's buildings with important local figures and historical/cultural events.

Figures that have already been presented include dairy farmer and Murray Goulburn driver Bill McKenzie, Victoria's first female park ranger Kara Moana Healey, golfer Gary Player, the Mattern family who pioneered the Yarram's hardware industry, Vietnamese business owner Liem Nguyen and his family, and Ralph Vale and his bullock train. A portrait of 19th Century opera singer Ada Crossley is also on the agenda of murals to be painted.

Other murals include native animals, ocean waves, period pieces relating to private businesses and property, and creative and colourful illustrations.

Gallery

See also 
 Yarram railway station
 List of reduplicated Australian place names

References

Towns in Victoria (Australia)
Shire of Wellington